Dennis Anthony Tito (born August 8, 1940) is an American engineer and entrepreneur. In mid-2001, he became the first space tourist to fund his own trip into space, when he spent nearly eight days in orbit as a crew member of ISS EP-1, a visiting mission to the International Space Station. This mission was launched by the spacecraft Soyuz TM-32, and was landed by Soyuz TM-31.

Life and career 
Tito was born in Queens, New York. He graduated from Forest Hills High School in New York City. He holds a Bachelor of Science degree in Astronautics and Aeronautics from New York University, 1962 and a Master of Science degree in Engineering Science from Rensselaer Polytechnic Institute satellite campus in Hartford, Connecticut. He is a member of Psi Upsilon and received an honorary doctorate of engineering from Rensselaer Polytechnic Institute on May 18, 2002 and is a former scientist of the NASA Jet Propulsion Laboratory.

Tito was appointed to the Los Angeles Department of Water and Power Board of Commissioners in the 1990s and led the board to support the landmark 1994 state ruling protecting Mono Lake from excessive water diversions by the city.

Investment career
In 1972, he founded the Wilshire Associates, a leading provider of investment management, consulting and technology services in Santa Monica, California.  Tito serves an international clientele representing assets of $71 billion. Wilshire relies on the field of quantitative analytics, which uses mathematical tools to analyze market risks – a methodology Tito is credited with helping to develop by applying the same techniques he used to determine a spacecraft's path at JPL. Despite a career change from aerospace engineering to investment management, Tito remained interested in space.

In 2020, Tito sold his interest in Wilshire Associates.

Personal life
 Dennis was divorced from his first wife Suzanne Tito, to whom he had been married since the 70s. They had 3 children together. She had been CFO of Wilshire Associates at the time they moved into their mansion in Pacific Palisades in 1990 with their 3 children, that they had been building since 1987.

 Dennis was married to Elizabeth Pavlova Tito, a Russian investor and Stanford alumna. They lived at Pacific Palisades in Los Angeles. 

From 2016 to 2019, Dennis was married to Elizabeth TenHouten.

Since 2020, Dennis has been married to Akiko Tito, an engineer, pilot, investor, who has had interest in spaceflight since childhood. She was born in Tokyo, has an economics degree and moved to New York in 1995, raising a child prior to her marriage to Dennis.

21st century space interests

Spaceflight 

In a project first arranged by MirCorp, Tito was accepted by the Russian Federal Space Agency as a candidate for a commercial spaceflight. Tito faced criticism from NASA before the launch, primarily from Daniel Goldin, at that time the Administrator of NASA, who considered it inappropriate for a tourist to take a ride into space. MirCorp, Goldin and Tito are profiled in the documentary film Orphans of Apollo. When Tito arrived at the Johnson Space Center for additional training on the American portion of the ISS, Robert D. Cabana, NASA manager, sent Tito and his two fellow cosmonauts home, stating, "...We will not be able to begin training, because we are not willing to train with Dennis Tito."

Later, through an arrangement with space tourism company Space Adventures, Ltd., Tito joined the Soyuz TM-32 mission which launched on April 28, 2001. The spacecraft docked with the International Space Station.  Tito and his fellow cosmonauts spent 7 days, 22 hours, 4 minutes in space and orbited the Earth 128 times. Tito performed several scientific experiments in orbit that he said would be useful for his company and business.  Tito paid a reported $20 million for his trip.

Since returning from space, he has testified at the Senate Committee on Commerce, Science & Transportation, Subcommittee on Science, Technology, and Space and the House Committee on Science, Subcommittee on Space & Aeronautics Joint Hearing on "Commercial Human Spaceflight" on July 24, 2003. Ten years after his flight, he gave an interview to BBC News about it.

Inspiration Mars Foundation 

In February 2013, Tito announced his intention to send a privately financed spaceflight to Mars by 2018, stating that the technology is already in place and that the issues that need to be overcome are only the requirements of the rigor of a 501-day trip on a psychological and physical level for the human crew. However, in November 2013, Tito and other Mars Inspiration team members admitted that their plan was impossible without significant levels of assistance and funding from NASA.

SpaceX Starship’s second commercial spaceflight around the Moon

On 12 October 2022, SpaceX announced that Dennis and Akiko Tito will be on the crew of the second commercial spaceflight of Starship around the Moon.

See also 

 List of space travelers by name

References

Further reading 
 Klerkx, Greg.  Lost in Space, The Fall of NASA. Random House: New York. 2004.

External links
 Tito the spaceman BBC web site (accessed February 2006)
 Spacefacts biography of Dennis Tito

 
1940 births
Living people
American money managers
Space tourists
Rensselaer Polytechnic Institute alumni
Amateur radio people 
Polytechnic Institute of New York University alumni
Forest Hills High School (New York) alumni
Glider pilots
Psi Upsilon